Bangalaia fulvosignata is a species of beetle in the family Cerambycidae, and the type species of its genus. It was described by Quedenfeldt in 1882, originally under the genus Sternotomis. It is known from Gabon, the Democratic Republic of the Congo, Angola, Equatorial Guinea, Cameroon, and the Republic of the Congo.

Varietas
 Bangalaia fulvosignata var. compta Jordan, 1903
 Bangalaia fulvosignata var. maculata (Hintz, 1913)
 Bangalaia fulvosignata var. transitiva (Breuning, 1935)
 Bangalaia fulvosignata var. uniformis (Hintz, 1913)

References

Prosopocerini
Beetles described in 1882